Eugoa tineoides is a moth of the family Erebidae first described by Francis Walker in 1862. It is found on Borneo. The habitat consists of lowland forests.

Adults have medium to dark brown forewings.

References

tineoides
Moths described in 1862